Henry Irving (18381905) was an English actor.

Henry Irving may also refer to:

Henry Brodribb Irving (1870–1919) was an English actor, son of the above Henry Turner Irving (18331923), Governor of British Guyana
Henry Irving (1950–2016), candidate in the Massachusetts House of Representatives elections, 2006

See also
Harry Irving (disambiguation)